Hemistomia lacinia is a species of minute freshwater snail with an operculum, an aquatic gastropod mollusc or micromollusc in the family Hydrobiidae. This species is endemic to New Caledonia, where it is currently only known from its type locality at Mt. Nogouta, a hill in Païta, northwest of Nouméa.

See also
List of non-marine molluscs of New Caledonia

References

Hemistomia
Endemic fauna of New Caledonia
Gastropods described in 1998
Freshwater molluscs of Oceania